Shell Rock Township may refer to the following townships in the United States:

 Shell Rock Township, Butler County, Iowa
 Shell Rock Township, Greenwood County, Kansas
 Shell Rock Township, Freeborn County, Minnesota